The Philadelphia Baseball Wall of Fame is a collection of plaques, mounted on a brick wall next to the Left Field Gate at Citizens Bank Park, the ballpark of the Philadelphia Phillies. From 1978 to 2003, the Phillies inducted one figure from their franchise history and one notable person from the Philadelphia Athletics (A's) organization each year—with the exception of 1983, when the Phillies inducted their Centennial Team. Once Veterans Stadium closed in 2003, the wall plaques used to recognize the Phillies' members were moved to Citizens Bank Park; however, the Phillies no longer induct notable Athletics. Each person inducted into the Wall of Fame was honored with a metal plaque showing the person's face; their position with, and years of service to the team; and a summary of their most important contributions. In March 2004, the Athletics' plaques were relocated to the Philadelphia Athletics Historical Society in Hatboro, Pennsylvania, and a single plaque listing all of the A's inductees was attached to a statue of Connie Mack located across the street from Citizens Bank Park.

Originally, the goal of the Wall of Fame was to induct the greatest players in Phillies and Athletics history; however, exceptions have been made for non-players who have made significant contributions to the organization. Mack, the Athletics' first inductee, had an 11-year playing career in the National League and the Players' League, but is most remembered for his managerial career, and was honored as such on the Wall. Members have been inducted for contributions in more than one area; Paul Owens, inducted in 1988, spent 48 years as a member of the Phillies organization, contributing as a scout, manager, general manager, and team executive. The Phillies have inducted four first basemen, four second basemen, five third basemen, three shortstops, one utility infielder, three catchers, 21 outfielders, 18 pitchers, seven managers, one general manager, one coach, two team executives, and two sportscasters. Twenty-one members of the Wall of Fame are also members of the Baseball Hall of Fame. All of the inductees in the first four seasons from both teams are members; Del Ennis was the first non-member to be inducted.

The first figures to be inducted into the Wall of Fame were Robin Roberts, who was inducted for the Phillies; and Mack, inducted for the A's. Roberts pitched in Philadelphia for 13 seasons as a member of the National League team, and Mack managed the American League club from 1901 to 1950. Although the Athletics have retired no numbers for players from their Philadelphia years, all seven players for whom the Phillies have retired a number or honored a "P" have been inducted into the Wall of Fame: Roberts (1978), Richie Ashburn (1979), Chuck Klein (1980), Grover Cleveland Alexander (1981), Jim Bunning (1984), Steve Carlton (1989), Mike Schmidt (1990), and Dick Allen (1994).

On April 10, 2017, it was announced Pete Rose would be that year's inductee into the wall of fame. However, on August 12, 2017, just 10 days before the ceremony, the Phillies announced Rose would not be inducted amid statutory rape allegations. Instead of inducting someone new, they celebrated past inductees.

For the 2018 season Citizens Bank Park was renovated, resulting in the Phillies Wall of Fame being moved from Ashburn Alley. A new Wall of Fame area was created behind the Left Field scoreboard, next to the Left Field gate. This overhauled Left Field Plaza honors the team’s history and incorporates new concession offerings. Featuring large replicas of the team’s World Series trophies from 1980 and 2008, statues of its retired numbers along with the relocated Wall of Fame it is an area for fans to learn about and honor the team's past.

Inductees

{| class="wikitable"
! colspan="6" style=";| Philadelphia Baseball Wall of Fame
|-  
!scope="col" style=";| Inducted
!scope="col" style=";| Player!scope="col" style=";| Team!scope="col" style=";| Position
!scope="col" style=";| Years
!class="unsortable" style=";| Ref
|- align="center"
| rowspan=2|
!scope="row" style="background-color:#ffffbb;"| 
| Philadelphia Phillies
| P
| –
| 
|- align="center"
!scope="row" style="background-color:#ffffbb;"| 
| Philadelphia Athletics
| MGR
| –
| 
|- align="center"
| rowspan=2|
!scope="row" style="background-color:#ffffbb;"| 
| Philadelphia Phillies
| OFTV
| ––
| 
|- align="center"
!scope="row" style="background-color:#ffffbb;"| 
| Philadelphia Athletics
| 1B
| –
| 
|- align="center"
| rowspan=2|
!scope="row" style="background-color:#ffffbb;"| 
| Philadelphia Phillies
| OF
| –––
| 
|- align="center"
!scope="row" style="background-color:#ffffbb;"| 
| Philadelphia Athletics
| P
| –
| 
|- align="center"
| rowspan=2|
!scope="row" style="background-color:#ffffbb;"| 
| Philadelphia Phillies
| P
| –
| 
|- align="center"
!scope="row" style="background-color:#ffffbb;"| 
| Philadelphia Athletics
| P
| ––
| 
|- align="center"
| rowspan=2|
!scope="row"| 
| Philadelphia Phillies
| OF
| –
| 
|- align="center"
!scope="row" style="background-color:#ffffbb;"| 
| Philadelphia Athletics
| C
| –
| 
|- align="center"
| 
!colspan="5" | 
|- align="center"
| rowspan=2|
!scope="row" style="background-color:#ffffbb;"| 
| Philadelphia Phillies
| P
| ––
| 
|- align="center"
!scope="row" | 
| Philadelphia Athletics
| 2B/3BMGR
| ––
| 
|- align="center"
| rowspan=2|
!scope="row" style="background-color:#ffffbb;"| 
| Philadelphia Phillies
| OF
| ––
| 
|- align="center"
!scope="row" style="background-color:#ffffbb;"| 
| Philadelphia Athletics
| P
| –
| 
|- align="center"
| rowspan=2|
!scope="row" | 
| Philadelphia Phillies
| OF
| –
| 
|- align="center"
!scope="row" style="background-color:#ffffbb;"| 
| Philadelphia Athletics
| P
| –
| 
|- align="center"
| rowspan=2|
!scope="row" | 
| Philadelphia Phillies
| SS
| –
| 
|- align="center"
!scope="row" style="background-color:#ffffbb;"| 
| Philadelphia Athletics
| 2B
| ––
| 
|- align="center"
| rowspan=2|
!scope="row" | 
| Philadelphia Phillies
| MGRGMEXEC
| , –––
| 
|- align="center"
!scope="row" | 
| Philadelphia Athletics
| OF
| ––
| 
|- align="center"
| rowspan=2|
!scope="row" style="background-color:#ffffbb;"| 
| Philadelphia Phillies
| P
| –
| 
|- align="center"
!scope="row" | 
| Philadelphia Athletics
| OF
| –
| 
|- align="center"
| rowspan=2|
!scope="row" style="background-color:#ffffbb;"| 
| Philadelphia Phillies
| 3B
| –
| 
|- align="center"
!scope="row" | 
| Philadelphia Athletics
| OF
| ––
| 
|- align="center"
| rowspan=2|
!scope="row" | 
| Philadelphia Phillies
| SSMGR
| ––
| 
|- align="center"
!scope="row" style="background-color:#ffffbb;"| 
| Philadelphia Athletics
| P
| –
| 
|- align="center"
| rowspan=2|
!scope="row" | 
| Philadelphia Phillies
| P
| –
| 
|- align="center"
!scope="row" | 
| Philadelphia Athletics
| P
| –
| 
|- align="center"
| rowspan=2|
!scope="row" | 
| Philadelphia Phillies
| P
| –
| 
|- align="center"
!scope="row" style="background-color:#ffffbb;"| 
| Philadelphia Athletics
| 3B
| –
| 
|- align="center"
| rowspan=2|
!scope="row" | 
| Philadelphia Phillies
| 1B/3B/OF
| ––
| 
|- align="center"
!scope="row" | 
| Philadelphia Athletics
| P
| –
| 
|- align="center"
| rowspan=2|
!scope="row" | 
| Philadelphia Phillies
| 3B
| –
| 
|- align="center"
!scope="row" | 
| Philadelphia Athletics
| SSMGR
| –
| 
|- align="center"
| rowspan=2|
!scope="row" style="background-color:#ffffbb;"| 
| Philadelphia Phillies
| OF
| –
| 
|- align="center"
!scope="row" | 
| Philadelphia Athletics
| P
| –
| 
|- align="center"
| rowspan=2|
!scope="row" | 
| Philadelphia Phillies
| OF
| –
| 
|- align="center"
!scope="row" | 
| Philadelphia Athletics
| 1B
| –
| 
|- align="center"
| rowspan=2|
!scope="row" | 
| Philadelphia Phillies
| OF
| –
| 
|- align="center"
!scope="row" | 
| Philadelphia Athletics
| OF
| ––
| 
|- align="center"
| rowspan=2|
!scope="row" | 
| Philadelphia Phillies
| P
| –
| 
|- align="center"
!scope="row" | 
| Philadelphia Athletics
| OF
| –
| 
|- align="center"
| rowspan=2|
!scope="row" | 
| Philadelphia Phillies
| OFMGR
| ––
| 
|- align="center"
!scope="row" | 
| Philadelphia Athletics
| P
| –
| 
|- align="center"
| rowspan=2|
!scope="row" | 
| Philadelphia Phillies
| OF
| –
| 
|- align="center"
!scope="row" | 
| Philadelphia Athletics
| OF
| –
| 
|- align="center"
| rowspan=2|
!scope="row" | 
| Philadelphia Phillies
| 2B
| ––
| 
|- align="center"
!scope="row" | 
| Philadelphia Athletics
| P
| –
| 
|- align="center"
| rowspan=2|
!scope="row" | 
| Philadelphia Phillies
| OF
| –
| 
|- align="center"
!scope="row" | 
| Philadelphia Athletics
| OF
| –
| 
|- align="center"
| 
!scope="row" style="background-color:#ffffbb;"| 
| Philadelphia Phillies
| OF
| –
| 
|- align="center"
| 
!scope="row" | 
| Philadelphia Phillies
| C
| –
| 
|- align="center"
| 
!scope="row" | | Philadelphia Phillies| PMGR
| ––
| 
|- align="center"
| 
!scope="row" | | Philadelphia Phillies| INFCOEXEC
| –, –––
| 
|- align="center"
| 
!scope="row" | | Philadelphia Phillies| 2BCO
| ––
| 
|- align="center"
| 
!scope="row" style="background:#cfc;"| | Philadelphia Phillies| TV
| –
| 
|- align="center"
| 
!scope="row" | | Philadelphia Phillies| C
| –
| 
|- align="center"
| 
!scope="row" | | Philadelphia Phillies| 1BTV
| ––present
| 
|- align="center"
| 
!scope="row" | | Philadelphia Phillies| C
| –
| 
|- align="center"
| 
!scope="row" | | Philadelphia Phillies|  P
| –
| 
|- align="center"
| 
!scope="row" | | Philadelphia Phillies| MGR
| –
| 
|- align="center"
| 
!scope="row" | | Philadelphia Phillies| OF
| –
|
|- align="center"
| 
!scope="row" style="background-color:#ffffbb;"| | Philadelphia Phillies| 1B
| –, 
|
|- align="center"
| 
!colspan="5" | 
|- align="center"
| 
!scope="row" style="background-color:#ffffbb;"| | Philadelphia Phillies| GMEXEC
| ––present
| 
|- align="center"
| 
!scope="row" style="background-color:#ffffbb;"| | Philadelphia Phillies| P
| –
| 
|- align="center"
| 
!scope="row" | | Philadelphia Phillies| OF
| –
| 
|- align="center"
| 
!scope="row" || Philadelphia Phillies| 2B
| –
| 
|- align="center"
| rowspan=2|
!scope="row" |
|rowspan=2| Philadelphia Phillies| RF/CF
| –
| rowspan=2|
|- align="center"
!scope="row" |
| P
| –
|}

Centennial Team

In 1983, rather than inducting a player into the Wall of Fame, the Phillies selected their Centennial Team, commemorating the best players of the first 100 years in franchise history. The Centennial Team includes players from several periods in Phillies history. The team is honored with a plaque listing the names of all players selected at the left end of the Wall of Fame. 11 members of the Centennial Team also have their own individual plaques on the Wall; those not otherwise included on the Wall are Jim Konstanty and Pete Rose.

Footnotes
 The induction committee judges entrants based on "longevity, ability, contributions to the [team] and baseball, character and special achievements". The committee has consisted of a variety of personnel, including team executives and members of the media.
This denotes that the player's number has been retired by his respective team. The Athletics have not retired any numbers from those who played their careers in Philadelphia.

References
General

Inline citations

External links
Philadelphia Athletics Historical Society

Philadelphia Phillies
Major League Baseball museums and halls of fame
Baseball
Halls of fame in Pennsylvania
Culture of Philadelphia
Philadelphia Athletics
Sports in Philadelphia
Tourist attractions in Philadelphia
Awards established in 1978
South Philadelphia
1978 establishments in Pennsylvania